The Tenth convocation of Parliament of Georgia was elected in the 2020 Georgian parliamentary election and is currently the current convocation of the Parliament.

The tenth convocation consists of 150 deputies. According to the June 29 constitutional amendment project, the 2020 parliamentary election were held with a mixed electoral system (120 proportional, 30 majoritarian) and a 1% threshold. The bill implies the so-called 40% locking mechanism as well. In particular, a party that would receive less than 40.54% support in the 2020 parliamentary elections under the proportional system would not be able to form the government independently..

9 political parties crossed the threshold established by the electoral legislation. Georgian Dream received 60 proportional and 30 (all) majoritarian mandates and won the parliamentary majority. The opposition parties declared the elections rigged and refused to enter the parliament. They demand to hold new elections.

Parliamentary factions

Initial composition

After 

Parties and political entities that boycott the elections and refuse to enter the parliament.

Members of parliament

Current members

Former members 
 Salome Mujiri (Girchi, resigned on 25 May 2021);
 Nika Melia (UNM, resigned on October 5, 2021);
 Zurab Japaridze (Girchi - More Freedom, resigned on 16 November 2021);
 Zaal Udumashvili (UNM, resigned on June 9, 2022);
 Levan Varshalomidze (UNM, resigned on September 6, 2022);
 Nona Mamulashvili (UNM, resigned on November 16, 2022);
 Vakhtang Kikabidze (UNM, died on January 15, 2023).
 Giorgi Khojevanishvili (For Georgia - 15th District, resigned on February 22, 2023).
 Levan Ioseliani (Citizens, resigned to become Public Defender on March 7, 2023).

References 

Parliament of Georgia